Giteau is a French surname that may refer to:
Kasey Giteau (born 1982), Australian swimmer
Kristy Giteau (born 1981), Australian rugby union player
Madeleine Giteau (1918–2005), French historian
Matt Giteau (born 1982), Australian rugby union player, brother of Kristy
Giteau's law introduced in 2015 by the Australian Rugby Union, named after Matt
Ron Giteau (born 1955), Australian rugby league footballer, father of Matt and Kristy

See also
 Guiteau

French-language surnames